Chris Schmidt (born 20 March 1989) is an Australian rules footballer. He now plays for SANFL club West Adelaide, the club he was originally drafted from. Schmidt holds the SANFL record for lowest goals to games ratio.

Brisbane Lions career
Debuting for Brisbane in Round 10, 2007 as an 18-year-old against , Schmidt struggled with just 1 kick and 5 handballs. The match ended in a draw. His Lions career was riddled with injuries, including osteitis pubis and a persistent shoulder problem. Schmidt played most of his footy with the Suncoast Lions during this period. He was delisted at the end of the 2008 season.

Adelaide career
He played senior football for his previous club, West Adelaide, before being elevated from the Crows rookie list due to a Brodie Martin long term injury.

West Adelaide career
He returned to the SANFL in 2012, again playing for West Adelaide.

In the 2013 Foxtel Cup Grand Final, Schmidt collected 26 disposals and nine clearances, at 81 per cent disposal efficiency. He was awarded the Coles Medal, as the player best on ground.

New West Adelaide senior coach Mark Mickan, himself a former player for both the Crows and West Adelaide where he is part of the Bloods Hall of Fame, appointed Schmidt as West Adelaide's new club captain for 2014 following the retirement of Ryan Ferguson.

After a disappointing 2014 SANFL season in which The Bloods slumped to 9th place (second last) on the ladder, Westies bounced back in 2015 to finish the minor round in 3rd place. Schmidt then led the club to its first SANFL premiership since 1983 with a dominant display in the 2015 SANFL Grand Final, amassing 44 disposals for the game (the most be any SANFL player in 2015) and winning the Jack Oatey Medal as the best player in the Grand Final as Westies defeated minor premiers  by 30 points at the Adelaide Oval. Schmidt joins Bernie Leahy (1908, 1909), Jos Dailey (1911, 1912), Bruce McGregor (1927), Johnny Taylor (1947), Neil Kerley (1961) and Ian Borchard (1983) as a West Adelaide premiership winning captains.

References

External links 
 

West Adelaide Football Club players
Adelaide Football Club players
Brisbane Lions players
1989 births
Living people
Australian rules footballers from South Australia